A tamper-resistant security module (TRSM) is a device that incorporates physical protections to prevent compromise of cryptographic security parameters that it contains.

There are varying levels of protection afforded by TRSMs:
  Tamper-resistance:  make intrusion difficult, usually by employing hardened casing
  Tamper-evident:  make intrusion attempts evident to subsequent viewers, often by employing seals which must be broken during intrusion
  Tamper-responsive: detect the intrusion attempt and destroy the contents in the process

A TRSM is usually also a hardware security module (HSM).

Cryptographic hardware